Gabin Villière (born 13 December 1995) is a French rugby union player who plays for Toulon in the Top14 and the France national team. His position is wing.

International career

International tries

Honours

International 
 France
Six Nations Championship: 2022
Grand Slam: 2022

References

External links 
 
 France profile at FFR
 Toulon profile

1995 births
Living people
French rugby union players
Rouen Normandie Rugby players
RC Toulonnais players
People from Vire
Rugby union wings
France international rugby union players
Sportspeople from Calvados (department)